The Shakespeare at Winedale program, created in 1970 by James B. "Doc" Ayres, is a program affiliated with the University of Texas at Austin, dedicated to Shakespearean criticism through performance of the plays. The main performance space at Winedale, located in Round Top, Texas, is a barn donated to the University of Texas by Ima Hogg.

Notable alumni
Mike Godwin
John Rando
Terry Galloway
James Loehlin
Kirk Lynn
Robert Matney
Asha Rangappa

References

External links
The Official Shakespeare at Winedale site

University of Texas at Austin
Theatre in Texas
Shakespeare festivals in the United States
Tourist attractions in Fayette County, Texas
Festivals in Texas